The 32nd Primetime Emmy Awards were held on Sunday, September 7, 1980, at the Pasadena Civic Auditorium. The awards show was hosted by Steve Allen and Dick Clark and broadcast on NBC. For the second year in a row, the top series awards went to the same shows, Taxi and Lou Grant. Lou Grant was the most successful show of the night winning five major awards. It also received 14 major nominations, tying the record for most major nominations by a drama series, set by Playhouse 90 in 1959.

The ceremony was held in the midst of a strike by members of the Screen Actors Guild; in a show of support for their union, 51 of the 52 nominated performers boycotted the event. Powers Boothe was the only nominated actor to attend; acknowledging his presence in his acceptance speech, he remarked, "This is either the most courageous moment of my career or the stupidest."

Winners and nominees

Programs

Acting

Lead performances

Supporting performances

Directing

Writing

Most major nominations
By network 
 CBS – 53
 NBC – 23
 ABC – 19

 By program
 Lou Grant (CBS) – 14
 M*A*S*H (CBS) – 10
 The Rockford Files (NBC) / The Scarlet O'Hara War, The Silent Lovers, This Year's Blonde (NBC)  – 6
 Barney Miller (ABC) – 5

Most major awards
By network 
 ABC / CBS – 10
 NBC – 4

 By program
 Lou Grant (CBS) – 5
  Baryshnikov on Broadway (ABC) / M*A*S*H (CBS) / The Miracle Worker (NBC) / Soap (ABC) / Taxi (ABC) – 2

Notes

References

External links
 Emmys.com list of 1980 Nominees & Winners
 

033
1980 television awards
1980 in California
September 1980 events in the United States